Devonport High may refer to:

 Devonport High School for Boys, Plymouth, England
 Devonport High School for Girls, Plymouth, England
 Devonport High School, Devonport, Tasmania